A total lunar eclipse will take place on June 6, 2058. The moon will pass through the center of the Earth's shadow.

Visibility

Related lunar eclipses

Lunar year series

Saros series

Tritos series

Inex series

Half-Saros cycle
A lunar eclipse will be preceded and followed by solar eclipses by 9 years and 5.5 days (a half saros). This lunar eclipse is related to two annular solar eclipses of Solar Saros 138.

See also 
List of lunar eclipses and List of 21st-century lunar eclipses

Notes

External links 
 

2058-06
2058-06
2058 in science
2058-06